Benzoin ( or ) is an organic compound with the formula PhCH(OH)C(O)Ph.  It is a hydroxy ketone attached to two phenyl groups. It appears as off-white crystals, with a light camphor-like odor. Benzoin is synthesized from benzaldehyde in the benzoin condensation.  It is chiral and it exists as a pair of enantiomers: (R)-benzoin and (S)-benzoin.

Benzoin is not a constituent of benzoin resin obtained from the benzoin tree (Styrax) or tincture of benzoin. The main component in these natural products is benzoic acid.

History
Benzoin was first reported in 1832 by Justus von Liebig and Friedrich Woehler during their research on oil of bitter almond, which is benzaldehyde with traces of hydrocyanic acid. The catalytic synthesis by the benzoin condensation was improved by Nikolay Zinin during his time with Liebig.

Uses
The main uses of benzoin are as a precursor to benzil, which is a photoinitiator.  The conversion proceeds by organic oxidation using copper(II), nitric acid, or oxone. In one study, this reaction is carried out with atmospheric oxygen and basic alumina in dichloromethane.

Benzoin can be used in the preparation of several pharmaceutical drugs including oxaprozin, ditazole, and phenytoin.

Preparation
Benzoin is prepared from benzaldehyde via the benzoin condensation.

References

External links
 Benzoin synthesis, Organic Syntheses, Coll. Vol. 1, p. 94 (1941); Vol. 1, p. 33 (1921)

Aromatic ketones
Acyloins